The 2010 Open d'Orléans was a professional tennis tournament played on hard courts. It was the sixth edition of the tournament which was part of the 2010 ATP Challenger Tour. It took place in Orléans, France between 18 and 24 October 2010.

ATP entrants

Seeds

 Rankings are as of October 11, 2010.

Other entrants
The following players received wildcards into the singles main draw:
  Michaël Llodra
  Xavier Malisse
  Vincent Millot
  Alexandre Sidorenko

The following players received a special entrant into the singles main draw:
  Marc Gicquel

The following players received entry from the qualifying draw:
  Pierre-Hugues Herbert
  Romain Jouan
  Philipp Oswald (LL)
  Nicolas Renavand
  Mathieu Rodrigues

Champions

Singles

 Nicolas Mahut def.  Grigor Dimitrov, 2–6, 7–6(6), 7–6(4)

Doubles

 Pierre-Hugues Herbert /  Nicolas Renavand def.  Sébastien Grosjean /  Nicolas Mahut, 7–6(3), 1–6, [10–6]

External links
Official Site
ITF Search 
ATP official site